Dundalk Clarke railway station serves Dundalk in County Louth, Ireland.

It consists of an island platform, with a bay facing south. It is served by the Dublin-Belfast "Enterprise" express trains as well as local Commuter services to and from Dublin. There is a small museum located in one of the station buildings, displaying various railway artefacts and photographs.

History
The original station opened on 15 February 1849 as Dundalk Junction (being located at the Junction of the Dublin-Belfast line and the Dundalk and Enniskillen line), the current Dundalk Station, 350m to the north, opened in June 1894. It was given the name Clarke on Sunday 10 April 1966 in commemoration of Tom Clarke, one of the executed leaders of the Easter Rising of 1916.

Architecture
The ticket office and modern waiting area are located at road level, whereas the station proper is beneath this at track level. The two sections are connected by a Victorian covered walkway, and by a 21st-century lift for disabled access. The station is noted for its fine iron, glass, and polychromic brickwork. It has been said to be the finest station on the Dublin-Belfast line.

GNR Railway Works
The town had the important Railway Works on the Great Northern Railway of Ireland system.  Amongst the products developed was the railbus.

See also
 List of railway stations in Ireland
 Great Northern Railway of Ireland

References

Gallery

External links
Irish Rail Dundalk Station Website
Eiretrains - Dundalk Station

Buildings and structures in Dundalk
Iarnród Éireann stations in County Louth
Railway stations in County Louth
Railway stations opened in 1849
Railway stations served by Enterprise
Transport in Dundalk
1849 establishments in Ireland
Railway stations in the Republic of Ireland opened in 1849